Tondano is the capital of Minahasa Regency, mainly in the district of West Tondano (Kecamatan Tondano Barat), in Sulawesi, Indonesia. The city is located in the highlands on the shores of Lake Tondano near Mount Tondano, and enjoys cool temperatures. The city can be reached from Manado around 35 km to the south via Tomohon city, through an eastern route via Kecamatan Tombulu, or through north-east via Airmadidi (the capital of North Minahasa Regency).

In Tondano city there is a Manado State University (UNIMA) campus in Tonsaru area, South Tondano. Tondano was the birthplace of Indonesian national hero Doctor Sam Ratulangi, that also the first governor of Sulawesi.

Tha name "tondano" in the Minahasa language is called toulour, which means "water people" (tou means people, lour means body of water).

The largest lake in this province located here named after the city, Lake Tondano.

Climate
Tondano has an elevation moderated tropical rainforest climate (Af) with moderate rainfall from July to September and heavy rainfall in the remaining months.

References

Populated places in North Sulawesi
Regency seats of North Sulawesi